Nou Sardenya is a municipally-owned football stadium in the Gràcia district of Barcelona, Catalonia, Spain. It is currently used mostly for football matches and is the home ground of CE Europa. The stadium holds about 7,000.

References

External links 

Page of CE Europa
Estadios de España 

CE Europa
Football venues in Barcelona
Sports venues completed in 1940
Gràcia